The Lady Clare is a 1919 British silent drama film directed by Wilfred Noy and starring Mary Odette, Jack Hobbs and Charles Quatermaine. It is based on the narrative poem Lady Clare by Lord Tennyson.

Cast    

 Mary Odette - Lady Clare
 Jack Hobbs - Lord Ronald Medwin
 Charles Quatermaine - Marquis of Hartlepool
 Simeon Stuart - Earl of Robhurst
 Gladys Jennings - Ann Sheldrake
 Mary Forbes - Lady Julia Medwin
 Barbara Everest - Alice
 Fewlass Llewellyn - Doctor Jenner
 Arthur Cleave - Charles Boulton
 Gilbert Esmond - Duke
 Winifred Evans - Clare Hampden
 Nancy O'Hara - Ursula Hampden

External links

The Lady Clare at the BFI Film & TV Database
Lady Clare By Alfred Lord Tennyson | Major English | Class 12

1919 films
1919 drama films
Films directed by Wilfred Noy
Films based on poems
Films based on works by Alfred, Lord Tennyson
British silent feature films
British drama films
British black-and-white films
1910s English-language films
1910s British films
Silent drama films